Luiz Marcelo de Castro Salles (born 6 February 1978), known as Marcelo Salles, is a Brazilian retired footballer who played as a central defender, and currently is assistant manager of Flamengo.

Career
Salles started his career at Flamengo in 2000, and became the assistant manager of the first team in 2005, under Joel Santana. In 2009, he was also Andrade's assistant as the club lifted the Série A trophy.

Salles subsequently followed Andrade to Brasiliense in 2010, and was also Santana's second at Cruzeiro and Bahia. He started his managerial career in March 2013, after being appointed manager of Rio Branco-ES.

Salles subsequently managed Nova Iguaçu (three stints), Bonsucesso (three stints), Audax Rio, Imperatriz, Portuguesa-RJ, Sampaio Corrêa-RJ and Volta Redonda. In 2019 he returned to Fla, again as an assistant.

On 29 May 2019, after Abel Braga's resignation, Salles was named interim manager until the arrival of Jorge Jesus in July.

Personal life
Salles is the son of Marco Antônio, a Brazilian former international footballer who played two FIFA World Cups, lifting the 1970 edition.

References

External links

1978 births
Living people
Footballers from Rio de Janeiro (city)
Brazilian footballers
Association football defenders
Brazilian football managers
Campeonato Brasileiro Série A managers
Campeonato Brasileiro Série C managers
Campeonato Brasileiro Série D managers
Rio Branco Atlético Clube managers
Nova Iguaçu Futebol Clube managers
Bonsucesso Futebol Clube managers
Audax Rio de Janeiro Esporte Clube managers
Sociedade Imperatriz de Desportos managers
Associação Atlética Portuguesa (RJ) managers
Sampaio Corrêa Futebol e Esporte managers
Volta Redonda Futebol Clube managers
CR Flamengo managers